Doris Hart (June 20, 1925 – May 29, 2015) was an American tennis player from who was active in the 1940s and first half of the 1950s. She was ranked world No. 1 in 1951. She was the fourth player, and second woman, to win a Career Grand Slam in singles. She was the first of only three players (all women) to complete the career "Boxed Set" of Grand Slam titles, which is winning at least one title in singles, doubles, and mixed doubles at all four Grand Slam events. Only she and Margaret Court achieved this during the amateur era of the sport.

Hart played collegiate tennis for the Miami Hurricanes at the University of Miami in Coral Gables, Florida.

Tennis career
Hart reached 67 Grand Slam finals and won 35  titles, tying with Louise Brough for sixth on the all-time list (behind Margaret Smith Court (64), Martina Navratilova (59), Billie Jean King (39), Serena Williams (39), and Margaret Osborne duPont (37)). Six of her titles were in women's singles, 14 in women's doubles, and 15 in mixed doubles. Hart is one of only three players, all women, to have a "boxed set" of Grand Slam titles — every possible title (singles, women's doubles, and mixed doubles) from all four Grand Slam tournaments. The others are Margaret Smith Court and Martina Navratilova. Hart was  the first person to accomplish this feat.

As a child, Hart suffered from osteomyelitis, which resulted in a permanently impaired right leg. She started playing tennis when she was 10 years old, greatly encouraged by her brother Bud.

After losing seven Grand Slam finals from 1942 through 1946, Hart won her first Grand Slam title at the 1947 Wimbledon Championships in women's doubles. At that point, she was still a student at the University of Miami.

Her first Grand Slam singles title came at the 1949 Australian National Championships, where she was the only non-Australian player in the draw. She also won singles titles at the 1950 and 1952 French International Championships, the 1951 Wimbledon Championships (routing doubles partner Shirley Fry in the final), and the 1954 and 1955 U.S. National Championships. The 1955 U.S. singles final was the last Grand Slam singles match of her career. 

Hart won the singles, women's doubles, and mixed doubles titles at the 1951 Wimbledon Championships, playing the finals of all three events on the same day (July 7, 1951). She also won the "triple crown" at the 1952 French International Championships and the 1954 U.S. National Championships.

During her Wightman Cup career from 1946 through 1955, Hart was a perfect 14–0 in singles matches and 8–1 in doubles matches.

Hart did not lose a Grand Slam women's doubles match from the 1951 French International Championships through the semifinals of the 1954 Wimbledon Championships, 43 matches in total, although she skipped 4 Grand Slam tournaments during this period. She also did not lose a mixed doubles match at the 13 Grand Slam tournaments she played from the 1951 French International Championships through the 1955 U.S. National Championships. She (and partner Stan Smith) lost in the third round of the 1968 Wimbledon Championships to Frew McMillan and Annette Van Zyl Du Plooy 6–3, 12–10.

According to John Olliff and Lance Tingay of The Daily Telegraph and the Daily Mail, Hart was ranked in the world top 10 from 1946 through 1955 (no rankings issued from 1940 through 1945), reaching a career high of world No. 1 in those rankings in 1951. Hart was included in the year-end top 10 rankings issued by the United States Lawn Tennis Association from 1942 through 1955. She was the top ranked U.S. player in 1954 and 1955.

Hart retired from the tour in late 1955 to become a tennis teaching professional. Her autobiography Tennis with Hart was published that year.

She was inducted into the inaugural Class of 1967 inductees to the University of Miami Sports Hall of Fame and inducted into the International Tennis Hall of Fame in 1969.

She died on May 29, 2015 at her home in Coral Gables, Florida at age 89.

Grand Slam finals

Singles (6 titles, 12 runners-up)

Doubles (14 titles, 16 runners-up)

Mixed doubles: 19 (15 titles, 4 runners-up)

Grand Slam performance timelines

Singles

Doubles

Mixed doubles

R = tournament restricted to French nationals and held under German occupation.
1In 1946 and 1947, the French Championships were held after Wimbledon.
2Hart did not play at this event. Her opponent got a walkover.

See also
 Performance timelines for all female tennis players who reached at least one Grand Slam final

References

External links

 
 

1925 births
2015 deaths
American autobiographers
Australian Championships (tennis) champions
American female tennis players
French Championships (tennis) champions
Grand Slam (tennis) champions in mixed doubles
Grand Slam (tennis) champions in women's doubles
Grand Slam (tennis) champions in women's singles
International Tennis Hall of Fame inductees
Miami Hurricanes women's tennis players
Tennis players from St. Louis
United States National champions (tennis)
Wimbledon champions (pre-Open Era)
Women autobiographers
World number 1 ranked female tennis players
20th-century American women